The 2017–18 Fenerbahçe Basketball season was the 104th season in the existence of the club. The team played in the Basketbol Süper Ligi (BSL) and in the European first tier EuroLeague. This is the first season the team was known as Fenerbahçe Doğuş, due to sponsorship reasons.

Players

Squad information

Transfers

Technical staff

General Manager   Maurizio Gherardini
Team Manager  Cenk Renda
Head coach  Željko Obradović
Assistant coach  Josep Maria Izquierdo Vladimir Androić Erdem Can Berkay Oğuz
Conditioning coach  Predrag Zimonjić  İlker Belgutay
Physiotherapist  Sefa Öztürk

Kit

Supplier: Nike
Main sponsor: Doğuş Group

Back sponsor: QNB Finansbank
Short sponsor: -

Statistics

Pre-season and friendlies

Fenerbahçe finished the tournament as champions

Competitions

Overall

Overview

Turkish Basketball Presidential Cup

Turkish Basketball Super League

League table

Regular season

Playoffs

Quarterfinals

Semifinals

Finals

Turkish Basketball Cup

Quarterfinals

EuroLeague

Regular season

Playoffs

Quarterfinals

Final Four

Semifinal

Final

Individual awards
Euroleague MVP of the Round
 Brad Wanamaker – Regular Season, Round 19
 Brad Wanamaker – Regular Season, Round 20
 Jan Veselý – Regular Season, Round 22

Magic Moment
  Jan Veselý

References

External links

2017-18
2017–18 in Turkish basketball by club
2017–18 EuroLeague by club